Gare de Cholet is a railway station serving the town Cholet, in the Maine-et-Loire department of western France. It is served by local trains (TER Pays de la Loire) to Angers, Clisson and Nantes.

References

Railway stations in Maine-et-Loire
Railway stations in France opened in 1865
Transport in Cholet